The Asia Spelling Cup is the largest annual spelling bee in Southeast Asia, and is organised by Qooco, a mobile language learning solutions provider. The first Asia Spelling Cup took place in Singapore in 2013, the next event took place in Bali, Indonesia in 2014, and the next in Bangkok, Thailand in 2015. The 2016 Asia Spelling Cup took place in Bangkok, Thailand, at the Conrad Hotel on November 12, 2016, and the 2017 event took place in Kuala Lumpur, Malaysia on November 12, 2017.

The Asia Spelling Cup draws on primary and secondary school students in various countries in Asia, including Malaysia, Thailand, China and Indonesia. The 2013 event included Singaporean students.

The competition
The Asia Spelling Cup consists of two parts, the Pre-Selection process and the finals

Pre-selection process
The pre-selection process is done online and via mobile, using testing software developed and provided by Qooco.

After completing the online tests, students are ranked by score, with the top students chosen for the finals. Pre-selection rounds regularly exceed 100,000 applicants.

Finals
The finals are usually held in a major city in Southeast Asia, in a hotel conference room or resort.

The Finals are split into two parts, the first part is the Primary school level competition, and the second part is the Secondary school level competition.

Asia Spelling Cup timeline

List of Champions

References

External links
www.asiaspell.com, the competition's official website
www.qooco.com, Qooco's official website

Spelling competitions
English spelling
Education in Southeast Asia